Gomphidius borealis is a mushroom in the family Gomphidiaceae that is found in Siberia.

References

External links

Boletales
Fungi described in 2002
Fungi of Asia